West Allotment is a village in the Metropolitan Borough of North Tyneside. Prior to 1974 it was part of Northumberland. A mile or so north of West Allotment, the extensive built-up areas of North Tyneside change abruptly into green belt stretching north into south east Northumberland.

West Allotment was originally a mining community. There is a World War One memorial situated on Benton Road.

Silverlink Biodiversity Park is a local nature reserve adjacent to the village, which at the top of the hill has an ornate giant sundial at its summit.

West Allotment is the nearest village to the Cobalt Business Park in North Tyneside.  The Cobalt is the UK's largest office park, and is the largest conglomeration of purpose-built office space in the Northern Hemisphere. Companies housed on the business park include Procter & Gamble, Orange, Santander UK, G4S; North Tyneside Council is also based there.

Housing estates
West Allotment used to consist only of 'The Allotment', built around 1820. The original Allotment houses were demolished under a 1960’s slum clearance scheme.

In the late 1800s, further land was purchased by the local colliery (Backworth Colliery Co Ltd) to build housing for miners. This new estate was named the "West Allotment". In the late 1990s, two new estates were constructed: Murrayfields and Holyfields. Holyfields is the larger of the two. 

Several sources refer to the village's name being connected to miners' garden allotments. However, this is not accurate, as the name comes from the enclosure acts, and this part of Tynemouthshire Moor being allocated to the Duke of Northumberland. This portion of land retained the simple name of allotment, the original 1820's village being called either "The Allotment" or "Northumberland Place".
A copy of the original lease, dated 1898, between the Duke of Northumberland and the Backworth Colliery Co Ltd for the land on which the West Allotment Terraces were built.The lease document is now held in the local history section, North Shields Library (2020)

Subsidence
A small number of properties in the area were found to have subsidence damage early in 2016. Investigations by the Coal Authority to find out the cause of the ground movement concluded that the surface damage at Bayfield was probably as a result of historical shallow coal mining. It was found necessary to demolish some properties, with compensation to the residents.

References

Villages in Tyne and Wear
Metropolitan Borough of North Tyneside